Suzon de Terson (1657–1685) was a 17th-century French poet.

Biography 
Suzon de Terson was born in 1657 in Puylaurens (currently part of the Tarn department) in a rich Protestant family and soon became passionate about poetic art.

In 1685, she died prematurely, following a long illness reflected in her poetry. Her writings were not published until 1968, by Christian Anatole.

She is the author of 81 poems including 15 written in the Occitan language.

Works 
Poësies diverses de Demoizelle Suzon de Terson: 1657-1685; French and Occitan texts established on the only known manuscript... by Christian Anatole (Lo Libre Occitan, 1968 ; Colleccion Fabri de Peiresc. - [Toulouse] : Institut d'Estudis Occitans) .

Bibliography 
 Suzon de Terson de Puylaurens (1657–1684), sa vie, son œuvre et son secret. Revue du Tarn numéro 2, 15 June 1956 
 Marie France Hilgar, "Suzon de Terson", in Katharina M. Wilson, An Encyclopedia of continental women writers, 1st vol. (A-K), Taylor & Francis, 1991, .

References

External links 
 Suzon de Terson on IdRef
 Suzon de Terson on openedition.org
 Poésies diverses de Demoiselle Suzon de Terson (texte manuscrit) on Occitanica

17th-century French poets
French women poets
1657 births
1685 deaths
Occitan-language poets